Gut, Guts or Gūts is a surname. Notable people with the surname include:

Alina Gut (born 1938), Polish parliamentarian
Andrzej Gut-Mostowy (born 1960), Polish politician
Gatis Gūts (born 1976), Latvian bobsledder
Irene Gut Opdyke (née Irena Gut, 1922–2003), Polish nurse who gained recognition for aiding Jews persecuted by the Nazis during World War II
Karel Gut (1927–2014), Czech ice hockey player
Lara Gut (born 1991), Swiss alpine ski racer
Max Gut (1898–1988), Swiss mathematician
Zbigniew Gut (1949–2010), Polish footballer